Philip Reeves RSA PRSW RGI RE (7 July 1931 - 14 March 2017) was an English artist, collage-maker and printmaker who lived for much of his life in Scotland.

Career 
His parents were Lillian Langford and Bert Reeves. He had a twin brother. Reeves studied at the Cheltenham School of Art (1947 - 1949) and at the Royal College of Art, London (1951-1954). Reeves became a lecturer at Glasgow School of Art in 1954 and was Head of Printmaking from 1970 to 1991. He founded the Edinburgh print makers workshop in 1967 and was a founder member of Glasgow Print Studio in 1972. He was a Fellow of the Royal Society of the Painter-Etchers and Engravers in 1951, an Associate of the Royal Scottish Academy in 1971, was the President of the Royal Scottish Society of Painters in Watercolours from 1998 to 2005. Reeves was instrumental in developing the printmaking department at Glasgow School of Art. As printmaking took on a more central role within contemporary art during the 1960s and 1970s, Reeves developed his own work and experimented with print techniques as well as moving into collage. Inspiration for his work came from rural or coastal areas - the West Highland Way or cliffs in the North of Scotland, as much as urban scenes and cityscapes.

Selected collections 

 The Fleming Collection
 The Hunterian Art Gallery, Glasgow
 Edinburgh City Council
 University of Stirling
 Salford Museum & Art Gallery
 Paisley Museum & Art Galleries
 Aberdeen Art Gallery
 British Government Art Collection
 Lillie Art Gallery, Milngavie
 Contemporary Art Society
 Dundee Art Gallery
University of Edinburgh
 Glasgow Art Gallery & Museum
 Art in Healthcare, Edinburgh
 Perth Art Gallery
 Royal Scottish Academy
 Scottish National Gallery of Modern Art
 University of Strathclyde
 Glasgow Print Studio

References

External links
 Art UK website (includes images)
 RSA Exhibition website for 'Philip Reeves - Intaglio' - includes video of the artist
 Philip Reeves at the Hughson Gallery - Selected Works

British printmakers
2017 deaths
1931 births
Alumni of the Royal College of Art
Academics of the Glasgow School of Art